Voysey is a family name, thought to derive from Vassy in Normandy,  the family’s place of residence prior to the Norman conquest.

It is the family name of the following people:

 Charles Voysey (theist), priest and heretic
 Charles Voysey (architect), son of the above, Arts and Crafts architect and designer
 Charles Cowles-Voysey, son of the above, architect and designer
 Henry Wesley Voysey (1791-1824), geologist who worked in India
 Michael Voysey, television writer

See also
The Voysey Inheritance, 1905 play by Harley Granville-Barker

References